is a private university in Tenri, Nara, Japan.

Academic departments 
 Nursing
 Medical laboratory science

External links
  

Universities and colleges in Nara Prefecture
Private universities and colleges in Japan
Tenrikyo